Batrachovirus is a genus of viruses in the order Herpesvirales, in the family Alloherpesviridae. Frogs serve as natural hosts. There are three species in this genus. Diseases associated with this genus include: raHV-1: Lucké tumor (renal adenocarcinoma).

Species 
The genus consists of the following three species:

 Ranid herpesvirus 1
 Ranid herpesvirus 2
 Ranid herpesvirus 3

Structure 
Viruses in Batrachovirus are enveloped, with icosahedral and spherical to pleomorphic geometries, and T=16 symmetry. The diameter is around 150-200 nm. Genomes are linear and non-segmented, around 220-231kb in length.

Life cycle 
Viral replication is nuclear, and is lysogenic. Entry into the host cell is achieved by attachment of the viral glycoproteins to host receptors, which mediates endocytosis. DNA-templated transcription is the method of transcription. Frogs serve as the natural host. Transmission routes are passive diffusion.

References

External links 

 Viralzone: Batrachovirus
 ICTV

Alloherpesviridae
Virus genera